Christopher Wayne Hook (born August 4, 1968) is an American former professional baseball relief pitcher and current coach. He is the pitching coach for the Milwaukee Brewers of Major League Baseball (MLB). He played in MLB for the San Francisco Giants.

Major league career
Chris Hook made his major league debut on April 30, 1995, against the Florida Marlins. He pitched one and two thirds of an inning, giving up one hit and one run. Overall, for the 1995 season, he had a 5–1 record with a 5.50 earned run average (ERA). In 1996, he made 10 appearances, which resulted in one loss and a 7.43 ERA.

Coaching career
From 2004 to 2007, he was the pitching coach, as well as manager of baseball operations for the Florence Freedom of the independent Frontier League. In February 2008, Hook announced he was leaving the Freedom to become pitching coach for the Double-A affiliate of the Milwaukee Brewers, the Huntsville Stars. Through the 2009 and 2011 seasons, Hook became the pitching coach for the Single-A affiliate of the Milwaukee Brewers, the Wisconsin Timber Rattlers. During the 2011-2012 offseason, it was announced Hook would return to Double-A Huntsville once more as pitching coach. He served as the Brewers' Double-A pitching coach through 2017, then as the Brewers' roving minor league pitching coordinator in 2018. 

Hook was hired as the Milwaukee Brewers' pitching coach on November 19, 2018.

References

External links
, or Retrosheet, or Baseball Reference (Minor and Independent leagues), or Pura Pelota (Venezuelan Winter League)

1968 births
Living people
Baseball coaches from California
Baseball players from San Diego
Cedar Rapids Reds players
Charleston Wheelers players
Chattanooga Lookouts players
Gulf Coast Reds players
Jackson Generals (Texas League) players
Las Vegas Stars (baseball) players
Lehigh Valley Black Diamonds players
Major League Baseball pitchers
Major League Baseball pitching coaches
Midland Angels players
Milwaukee Brewers coaches
Minor league baseball coaches
Northern Kentucky Norse baseball players
Northern Kentucky University alumni
Phoenix Firebirds players
San Francisco Giants players
Shreveport Captains players
Somerset Patriots players
Tiburones de La Guaira players
American expatriate baseball players in Venezuela